Hatun Waqya (Quechua hatun big, waqya call, appeal, "big call (or appeal)", Hispanicized spelling Jatun Huaguia) is a mountain in the Andes of Peru which reaches an altitude of approximately . It is located in the Junín Region, Yauli Province, Carhuacayan District, and in the Pasco Region, Pasco Province, Huayllay District. Hatun Waqya lies northwest of the lake named Waskhaqucha.

References

Mountains of Peru
Mountains of Junín Region
Mountains of Pasco Region